Taiseishōgun-ji (大聖勝軍寺) is a Buddhist temple in Yao, Osaka Prefecture, Japan. It was founded in 587 and is affiliated with Kōyasan Shingon-shū.

See also 
Historical Sites of Prince Shōtoku

6th-century establishments in Japan
Buddhist temples in Osaka Prefecture
Kōyasan Shingon temples
Prince Shōtoku
Religious buildings and structures completed in 587